Lau or LAU may refer to:

People 
 Lau (surname)
 Liu (劉/刘), a common Chinese family name transliterated Lau in Cantonese and Hokkien
 Lau clan, one of the Saraswat Brahmin clans of Punjab
 LAU (musician): Laura Fares

Places 
 Lebanese American University, an America university in Lebanon
 Lau, Estonia, a village in Estonia
 Lau, Gotland, a locality on Gotland, Sweden
 Lau, Nigeria, a local government area
 Lau (crater), a crater on Mars
 Lau Islands, Fiji
 Lau Province, Fiji
 Laurel station (Mississippi), a passenger railway station in Laurel, United States
 LAU, IATA code for Manda Airport, a public airport on Manda Island, Kenya

Languages 
 Lau language of Nigeria
 Lauan language, also called Lau, spoken in Fiji, ISO 639-3: llx
 Lau language (Malaita), spoken in the Solomon Islands, ISO 639-3: llu

Other uses
 Lau Chan, fictional character in video game Virtua Fighter Series
 Lau (band), a British folk music group
 Lambda Alpha Upsilon, a Greek letter intercollegiate fraternity
 Local administrative unit (see Nomenclature of Territorial Units for Statistics), a low level administrative division of a country, ranked below a province, region, or state
 Lẩu, Vietnamese hot pot
 Lauinger Library, the main library at Georgetown University, which is commonly known as "Lau"
 Leeds Arts University
 Lau Taveuni Rotuma (Open Constituency, Fiji), a former electoral division
 LAU, a United States military designator for aerial rocket launchers

See also
 Iau (disambiguation)